Roadrunner is a bird of the genus Geococcyx.

Roadrunner or Road Runner may also refer to:

 The Road Runner, an animated character based on the bird
 The Road Runner Show, compiled cartoons including the character

Companies
 New Mexico Rail Runner Express
 Road Runner Express (disambiguation)
 Roadrunner Markets, a chain of convenience stores in Virginia, North Carolina, South Carolina and Tennessee, United States
 Roadrunner Network, Inc., a visual effects firm based in the Philippines
 Road Runner Railway, former name of Lil' Devil Coaster, a roller coaster at Six Flags Great Adventure in New Jersey
 Road Runner Rollercoaster, a Vekoma Junior Coaster in Australia

Computing 
 Road Runner High Speed Online, former name of Time Warner Cable
 Roadrunner (supercomputer), a 2008 supercomputer built by IBM
 MicroOffice RoadRunner, an early laptop from 1983
 RoadRunner (application server), an application server
 Road Runner, a shell for carputers

Film and TV
 "Roadrunners" (The X-Files), an episode of The X-Files
 Roadrunner: A Film About Anthony Bourdain, 2021 documentary film

Music 
 Roadrunner Records, a record label
 The Roadrunners, 1960s R&B band from Liverpool

Albums
 Road Runner (Junior Walker album), a 1966 album by Junior Walker & The All-Stars
 Roadrunner (Hurriganes album), 1974, with a cover of the Bo Diddley song
 Roadrunners!,  a 1990 compilation CD by Eric Burdon and The Animals
 Roadrunner, a 1991 demo record by Cynic
 Roadrunner: New Light, New Machine, a 2021 album by Brockhampton

Songs
 "Roadrunner" (Jonathan Richman song), 1972
 "Road Runner" (Bo Diddley song), a 1960 song by Bo Diddley
 "(I'm a) Road Runner", a 1965 song made famous by Junior Walker and the All-Stars
 "Roadrunner", a 2021 song by the hip hop group Migos

Publications
 Valley Roadrunner, a newspaper in Valley Center, California
 Roadrunner (Australian music magazine), published in Adelaide, South Australia between 1978 and 1982
 Roadrunner (magazine), about motorcycle touring

Sports 
 Cal State Bakersfield Roadrunners, the athletic program of California State University, Bakersfield
 Correcaminos Colon, professional basketball team in Panama. (Correcaminos is the Spanish word for Roadrunner)
 Metro State Roadrunners, the athletic program of Metropolitan State University of Denver
 Phoenix Roadrunners (disambiguation), the name of several ice hockey teams
 SFCC Roadrunners, from the State Fair Community College in Sedalia, Missouri
 Tucson Roadrunners, a hockey team
 Yvan Cournoyer (born 1943), Canadian hockey player nicknamed "The Roadrunner"
 UTSA Roadrunners, the athletic program of the University of Texas at San Antonio
 A participant of road running

Other uses
 Plymouth Road Runner, a type of automobile, eponymous for the cartoon character
 Road Runner (video game), a 1985 racing game
 USS Road Runner (AMc-35), United States Navy minesweeper
 Road Runner, Texas, incorporated town in Cooke County

See also
Road racing (disambiguation)